Copelatus lepersonneae is a species of diving beetle. It is part of the genus Copelatus in the subfamily Copelatinae of the family Dytiscidae. It was described by Gschwendtner in 1943.

References

lepersonneae
Beetles described in 1943